Penicillium incoloratum is a species of the genus of Penicillium.

References

incoloratum
Fungi described in 1994